Bagh (also Romanized as Bāgh; also known as Bag) is a village in Qareh Poshtelu-e Bala Rural District, Qareh Poshtelu District, Zanjan County, Zanjan Province, Iran. At the 2006 census, its population was 321, in 69 families.

References 

Populated places in Zanjan County